Lennart Albert Heljas (13 May 1896 – 9 March 1972) was a Finnish politician of the Centre Party, cabinet minister and Lutheran priest. He served as a member of the Parliament of Finland from 1939 to 1958, and was vice president of the parliament in 1946, 1954–1956 and in 1957. He served as Minister of Social Affairs from 1946 to 1948 and as Minister of Education in 1948 and from 1950 to 1951. He served as President of the Nordic Council in 1957.

References

1896 births
1972 deaths
Politicians from Vyborg
People from Viipuri Province (Grand Duchy of Finland)
20th-century Finnish Lutheran clergy
Centre Party (Finland) politicians
Ministers of Social Affairs of Finland
Ministers of Education of Finland
Members of the Parliament of Finland (1939–45)
Members of the Parliament of Finland (1945–48)
Members of the Parliament of Finland (1948–51)
Members of the Parliament of Finland (1951–54)
Members of the Parliament of Finland (1954–58)
University of Helsinki alumni